Flagstaff is a ghost town and former town in Somerset County, Maine, United States, near the existing town of Eustis and about 20 miles north of Rangeley. 

Benedict Arnold camped here on his Quebec expedition and erected a flagstaff, hence the name.

The town was abandoned and dismantled (and legally disincorporated) in 1950 to allow construction of a hydroelectric dam on the Dead River, which enlarged Flagstaff Lake and submerged the site of the settlement. 

The song "Below" by Slaid Cleaves on his 2004 album Wishbones refers to the destruction of the town, although it is not mentioned by name. The lyrics specifically mention the Dead River, and its general location.

References

External links
 Windows on Maine - The Plan to Flood Flagstaff - Maine PBS
 A map of Flagstaff and its surrounding area pre-flooding 
 A contemporary history of Flagstaff with historical photos and a radio story about the fires set to clear the land before the flooding

Ghost towns in Maine
Geography of Somerset County, Maine
Submerged settlements in the United States